Mira Das is an Indian politician. She was a Member of Parliament, representing Odisha in the Rajya Sabha the upper house of India's Parliament as a member of the Janata Dal

References

Rajya Sabha members from Odisha
Janata Dal politicians
Women members of the Rajya Sabha
1941 births
Living people